Andrew Gerard Hill (born 1957) is an English record producer and songwriter who worked with Bucks Fizz and Celine Dion during the 1980s and 1990s.

On many of his compositions he was partnered by lyricist Peter Sinfield, who had formerly worked with King Crimson. He has been nominated for an Ivor Novello Award on seven occasions, and has won the award twice in the category "Best Song Musically and Lyrically" and once for "Songwriter of the Year". He also composed the winning song in the 1981 Eurovision Song Contest.

Career
Hill experienced his earliest success when he co-wrote and produced the UK's winning 1981 Eurovision Song Contest entry for Bucks Fizz, "Making Your Mind Up".

Hill took part in the 1981 A Song For Europe contest, alongside his partner (and later his wife, now ex-wife) Nichola Martin, with their band Gem, performing "Have You Ever Been in Love?" This was released as a single under the name Paris but did not chart. Leo Sayer took his version of the single into the UK Singles Chart. The song been covered by many other musicians.

For much of the decade, Hill concentrated on carving a successful career for Bucks Fizz and following their Eurovision chart-topper, he went on to write and produce two further UK number 1's "The Land of Make Believe" and "My Camera Never Lies". By 1986 he was responsible for (either writing or producing) all 11 of the band's UK Top 20 hits.
 
Since then, he has also written for Eminem, The Wanted, Celine Dion, Cliff Richard, Ronan Keating, Diana Ross, Westlife, Boyzone, Cher, Johnny Hallyday,  and Queen. These writing credits include Celine Dion's "Think Twice" (1994), which reached number one in the charts of Belgium, Denmark, Ireland, Netherlands, Norway, Sweden and the United Kingdom. In the UK, the song topped the chart for seven weeks in 1995, and went on to sell over a million copies. It remains Hill's biggest hit to date. He subsequently wrote "Call the Man" for Celine Dion's album Falling into You which, with sales in excess of 32 million, is one of the biggest selling albums of all time. He also gained success in the US, when he partnered with Peter Cetera for his World Falling Down album. From this, the single "Restless Heart" reached number 1 on the Adult Contemporary Chart for 10 consecutive weeks.

More recently he has written songs for Il Divo on their debut album, and collaborated with Gary Barlow on Katherine Jenkins 2007 album,  Rejoice. He wrote "Proud" on Susan Boyle's 2009 album, I Dreamed a Dream, and has written songs for Westlife, Johnny Hallyday and Boyzone.

Compositions
His songs include;

"Give a Little Bit More" (Cliff Richard, I'm No Hero, 1980)
"Making Your Mind Up" (Bucks Fizz, 1981) 
"Piece of the Action" (Bucks Fizz, 1981)
"The Land of Make Believe" (Bucks Fizz, 1981)
"Have You Ever Been in Love" (Leo Sayer, 1982)
"My Camera Never Lies" (Bucks Fizz, 1982)
"Now Those Days are Gone"  (Bucks Fizz, 1982)
"If You Can't Stand the Heat"  (Bucks Fizz, 1982)
"Run for Your Life"  (Bucks Fizz, 1983)
"One Touch Too Much" (Katz, 1985)
"Two Strong Hearts" (John Farnham, 1988)
"Heart of Stone"  (Cher, Heart of Stone, 1989)
"Restless Heart"  (Peter Cetera, 1992)
"Peace in Our Time" (Cliff Richard, The Album, 1993)
"Think Twice" (Celine Dion, The Colour of My Love, 1994)
"Call the Man" (Celine Dion, Falling into You, 1996)
"Real World" (D-Side, 2003)
"Reaching Out" (Queen + Paul Rodgers, 2005)
"I'll See You Again" (Westlife, 2009)
"Beautiful" (Eminem, 2009)
"Proud" (Susan Boyle, 2009)
"Walks like Rihanna" (The Wanted, 2013)
"" (Johnny Hallyday, 2014)

Other musicians for whom he wrote album songs:
 Boyzone
 Michael Ball
 Bonnie Tyler
 Lulu
 Elaine Paige
 Elkie Brooks
 Jane Wiedlin
 Vanessa Mae
 Barbara Dickson
 Nick Berry
 Albert Hammond
 Bad English

Producer
As a producer, Hill produced many of Bucks Fizz's biggest hits, as well as UK top ten hits "One Step Further" by Bardo; "Real World" by D-Side and the US AC number one "Restless Heart" by Peter Cetera.

Performer
As a performer he played guitar, and performed backing vocals, on many of his own productions. He also sang lead vocals for his short-lived early 1980s band, Paris. The group originally took part in the 1981 Song for Europe under the name Gem, with "Have You Ever Been in Love". Paris started out as a quartet of Hill, Nicola Martin (keyboards, backing vocals), Graham Broad (drums, backing vocals) and Ian Bairnson (guitars). Bairnson left the group after the first single and they remained a three-piece.

Paris released four singles in total:

Of these, only "No Getting Over You" made the UK Singles Chart, peaking at number 49.

Other work
From 2001 to 2006, Hill owned the Nyetimber vineyard in West Sussex, a sparkling wine producer.

References

External links
 Andy Hill fan site

1957 births
Living people
English songwriters
English record producers
Ivor Novello Award winners
Eurovision Song Contest winners
People from Bracknell